Philip Douglas Gifford (born 1947) is a New Zealand sportswriter and broadcaster. He has his own rugby radio show Front Row on Radio Sport from 8 to 10am on Saturdays. He writes a weekly column in the country's highest circulation weekend paper, The Sunday Star-Times, and is a contributing editor to North & South magazine. He created the satirical rugby character Loosehead Len in 1973, and has seven books under that name.

Gifford has written rugby best-sellers including his book on Alex Wyllie, Grizz, The Legend (1991), which has sold 30,000 copies, making it the biggest-selling New Zealand sports book of the 1990s. He co-hosted a top rating breakfast show with Simon Barnett. Barnett and Gifford hosted the breakfast show on 91ZM Christchurch between 1992 and 1997 before being enticed to work on opposition station 92 More FM for a large sum of money. Gifford continued to co-host breakfast on More FM, Christchurch until 2003 when he moved to Radio Sport. 91ZM Christchurch was a top rating station in Christchurch when he and Barnett hosted breakfast and More FM Christchurch enjoyed the top rating spot in the years following this. In 2019, Gifford rejoined Simon Barnett on Newstalk ZB Weekday Afternoons until mid 2021.

In 2002, he won a celebrity special of The Weakest Link raising $9600 for a nominated charity.

Gifford writes a music column for Auckland magazine North & South.

References

External links
 Phil Gifford's Opinion at Rugby Heaven

1947 births
Living people
New Zealand columnists
New Zealand journalists
New Zealand radio presenters
New Zealand sportswriters
New Zealand sports historians
Rugby historians and writers